Adelphobates galactonotus (splash-backed poison frog or splashback poison frog) is a species of poison dart frog. It is endemic to the rainforest of the southern Amazon Basin in Brazil. Its natural habitats are tropical moist lowland forests. The eggs are laid on the ground, but the tadpoles are carried to temporary pools. Though it remains widespread and locally common, it is threatened by habitat loss and has already disappeared from some localities due to deforestation and flooding caused by dams. The species is relatively common in captivity and regularly bred, but the wild populations are still at risk from illegal collection.

The best known variants of this species are black below and yellow, orange or red above, but its color is extremely variable with some having whitish-mint or light blue upperparts,  some having a mottled or spotted pattern above, and some being almost all whitish (popularly known as "moonshine" among captive frog keepers), yellow-orange or black. It has been speculated that some morphs were separate species, but genetic testing have revealed virtually no difference between them (including a distinctive  variant from Cristalino State Park with a yellow-and-black netted pattern) and the distributions of the morphs do not follow a clear geographic pattern as expected if they were separate species.

References

External links

galactonotus
Amphibians of Brazil
Endemic fauna of Brazil
Amphibians described in 1864
Taxa named by Franz Steindachner
Taxonomy articles created by Polbot